Stripperella (also referred to as Stan Lee's Stripperella) is an American adult animated superhero comedy television series created by Stan Lee for Spike. The lead character is a stripper named Erotica Jones who is secretly the superhero/secret agent Stripperella. The series was produced by The Firm and Spike Animation. It is rated TV-MA in the United States.

Stripperella debuted on Spike TV in summer 2003 and lasted one season with 13 episodes. Anderson described it as not being a raunchy show, despite obvious double entendres and topless nudity (which was blurred out when shown on Spike TV).

In Australia, Stripperella began airing uncensored on SBS TV, starting Monday March 13, 2006, at 21:00 local time (9:00PM), after having previously been restricted to early-morning airings on the Nine Network. In the United Kingdom, Stripperella is aired uncensored as part of the U.K. incarnation of the Cartoon Network's Adult Swim programming block. In Germany, the show aired uncensored on Comedy Central Germany available for all audiences. In Italy, it is aired on FX Italia, uncensored and unrated; in Latin America is transmitted by MTV Latin America; and in Brazil was transmitted by Multishow.

Background

Biography

Erotica Jones AKA Stripperella is an extremely attractive, unbearably beautiful, and insanely sexy dancer with a literally perfect body. Many people are jealous of Erotica's bust size, especially her coworkers. At the club, more people drool over her than anybody else. On a news interview, a reporter fawned over her lips, bosom, and legs. Erotica said she enjoys her pleasantly but extremely revealing outfits because she enjoys showing off her irresistible "assets".

She also has a brother named Chipperella (Jon Cryer), who also happened to be a stripper living the double life as a superhero and secret agent. He was briefly mentioned when Stripperella temporarily lost faith in her crime fighting abilities after having been shrunken by Small Fry. He appears in a flashback as a hunky blonde and is affectionately referred to by Erotica and Chief Stroganoff as "Chip." In a humorous anecdote, Stroganoff tells Stripperella that her brother's memory was erased, later being mostly restored except for the word 'quit' which was forever erased from his memory.

Appearance

Stripperella is a drop-dead gorgeous young lady with blonde hair that is styled into a big-bouffant, blue eyes, glossy lips, coppertone complexion, big breasts, long legs, plump buttocks, and flawless skin. She wears an indigo-colored, provocative-looking superheroine uniform that consists of an eye-mask, windowed-jacket, short-skirt, tight-panties, and thigh-high heeled boots, but is some episodes her boots are shorter.

The animation style changed halfway through the show's run, becoming brighter and revamping the looks of many of the show's major characters. Stripperella, for example, was now drawn with a cowl having larger eyeholes that look similar to Batgirl's, as well as exaggerated body features such as longer legs, a smaller waist, and fuller breasts that are now the same size as when Erotica inflated them in Season 1's 11th episode Cheapo by the Dozen. Fellow stripper Persephone now had a darker complexion and an accent that inexplicably changed from episode to episode.

Personality

Erotica is known to be sweet, bubbly, ditzy and slightly naive. However, she is known to be serious, patient, cautious, attentive, brave and courageous. Her greatest dream ever since she was a little girl is to become a bride, she has a heart of gold and beautiful on the inside as well as the outside.

Powers & Abilities:

When Erotica is Stripperella, she is known to have several powers that she uses, whether it's her big breasts or her extraordinary body.

Combat Expertise
Stripperella has extraordinary skills of "Sexy" martial arts and "Killer" moves.
Superhuman Enhancements
Enhanced reflexes, senses, super strength, flexibility, intellect, breasts, and gravity-defying jumps are all what Stripperella has in her arsenal of superpowers.
Extreme Hotness
Stripperella is hot enough to make a man catch fire when near her.
Powerful Lungs
Stripperella's breathing is strong enough to administer mouth-to-mouth resuscitation on any victim who is either morbidly obese or abnormally gigantic, she can even blow a monkey out of a Tank gun through the barrel.
Skin Immunity
Stripperella is impervious to temperature and weather conditions. She says this while wearing a bikini in the snow. She also mentions this in Eruption Junction, What's Your Function?
Breast Expansion
Instantly expanding her big bust. She holds her breath and they inflate to increase a few bra-sizes. This power is natural. Seen in Cheapo by the Dozen, so that she could float to rescue a drowning man.
Lie-Detecting Cleave-Conspirators
When someone holds them, she can determine whether a person is lying. Seen in The Wrath of Klinko, to see if a man is telling the truth. She mentions that this power naturally comes from her breasts without the use of technology. It is currently unknown what will happen if someone lies while holding her breasts.
Flawless Body
Literally having a body that is flawless. Seen in Beauty and the Obese: Part 1 when Nairasec Rotcod (Doctor Cesarian) is inspecting her.
Hairachute
Stripperella's hair is so thick, luxuriant, and extravagant that it can be used as an effective parachute.
Dedicated Animal Rights Activist Supporter
Stripperella fights for all animals except giant crabs, which she hates as her weakness.
Limitless Cleavage
An extreme Victoria's Secret Compartment. She has been seen many times pulling various objects, sometimes even ones too big to fit, out of her cleavage. This is probably where she stores her costume. Most of the things kept there are ridiculous.

Gadgets & Gizmos

Stripperella has access to a number of super-technological make-up themed or Bond-esque devices of questionable usefulness.

Glass Cutter Nipples 
The pasties fit over her actual nipples and turn into metal drill bits, elongate, and start spinning. This power is given to her by technology. She controls this power mentally. Mentioned in Beauty and the Obese: Part 2 and seen in Cheapo by the Dozen, to get out of a trap, and in You Only Lick Twice, to get into the hideout.
Nipple Camera
Mentioned in The Wrath of Klinko. Given to her by technology. The pictures it takes are very small, which she doesn't like.

Recurring characters
 Erotica's workplace TenderLoins features the wishy-washy owner Kevin (voiced by Tom Kenny), swishy bartender Leonard (voiced by Maurice LaMarche), and dancers Persephone (voiced by Sirena Irwin) who is promiscuous and switches accents, and naive and good-natured country girl Giselle (voiced by Jill Talley). The newest member, the antagonistic Catt (voiced by Joey Lauren Adams), gets hired in TenderLoins under false pretenses of being an Amish virgin.
 The main competition of TenderLoins is SiliCones, a strip club owned by Dirk McMahon (voiced by Vince McMahon) who openly admits his obsession for Erotica to work at his club.
 Stripperella works for the agency FUGG under Chief Stroganoff (voiced by Maurice LaMarche). Other recurring FUGG members include technicians Hal and Bernard (voiced by Tom Kenny and Greg Proops), and Special Agent 14 (voiced by Tom Kenny).
 There are two recurring villains: Cheapo (voiced by Maurice LaMarche), the world's cheapest bad guy, and Queen Clitoris (pronounced kli-TOR-is) (voiced by Sirena Irwin), a woman who lashes out on society for her facial appearance.
 Reporters Skip Withers (voiced by Tom Kenny) and Margo Van Winkle (voiced by Jill Talley) appearing when TV news coverage is needed.  Weird Al has appeared twice without any lines.

Episodes
Note: What follows is the chronology according to the DVD release. Spike TV aired the episodes out of order. The air dates have not been changed.

Critical reception
Rob Owen of the Pittsburgh Post-Gazette gave the show a positive review, saying that it was "unexpectedly clever, albeit sometimes crude", and that its "tongue in cheek" humor was reminiscent of the 1960s Batman series.

Home media
The Complete DVD boxed set released on February 22, 2005, contains uncensored versions with a new opening theme replacing the original Kid Rock song.
Recently, Paramount and Viacom have allowed Mill Creek Entertainment to acquire the distribution rights to any future DVD reissues.

Comic books
Originally there was to have been a promotional Stripperella comic published by Humanoids Publishing (publishers of Métal Hurlant magazine) alongside the animated series, but creative differences between Spike TV and Pamela Anderson saw it canceled before publication.

Legal controversy
In 2003, ex-stripper Janet Clover, a.k.a. "Jazz", a.k.a. "Stripperella", filed a lawsuit in the Daytona Beach, Florida circuit court against Viacom, Stan Lee, and Pamela Anderson, claiming she is Stripperella's true creator and Stan Lee stole her idea when she discussed it during a "private dance session".

References

External links 

 
 

2000s American adult animated television series
2000s American crime television series
2000s American parody television series
2000s American superhero comedy television series
2003 American television series debuts
2004 American television series endings
American adult animated action television series
American adult animated comedy television series
American adult animated superhero television series
Characters created by Stan Lee
English-language television shows
Parody superheroes
Animated superheroine television shows
Fictional erotic dancers
Spike (TV network) original programming